The 2019–20 Liverpool F.C. Women season was the club's 31st season of competitive football and its 10th season in the FA Women's Super League, the highest level of the football pyramid, having been one of the league's foundation clubs. Along with competing in the WSL, the club also contested two domestic cup competitions: the FA Cup and the League Cup.

On 13 March 2020, in line with the FA's response to the coronavirus pandemic, it was announced the season was temporarily suspended until at least 3 April 2020. After further postponements, the season was ultimately ended prematurely on 25 May 2020 with immediate effect. Liverpool sat bottom of the table at the time and were relegated on sporting merit after The FA Board's decision to award places on a points-per-game basis.

Squad

Pre-season 
Liverpool spent part of their preseason on tour in the United States in conjunction with the men's team.

FA Women's Super League

Results summary

Results by matchday

Results

League table

Women's FA Cup 

As a member of the top two tiers, Liverpool entered the FA Cup in the fourth round, beating Championship side Blackburn Rovers in their opening fixture. Following a series of postponements at EFL League One ground Prenton Park, the game was moved to Blackburn's home ground at Bamber Bridge although Liverpool remained the designated home team.

FA Women's League Cup 

For the League Cup group stage, Liverpool were drawn as the only FA WSL team in a group that otherwise contained five FA Women's Championship teams.

Group stage

Squad statistics

Appearances 

Starting appearances are listed first, followed by substitute appearances after the + symbol where applicable.

|-
|colspan="14"|Players away from the club on loan:

|}

Goalscorers

Transfers

Transfers in

Transfers out

Loans out

References 

Liverpool
2019-20